Long Night's Journey Into Day is a 2000 American documentary film about the Truth and Reconciliation Commission in post-Apartheid South Africa. It was nominated for an Academy Award for Best Documentary Feature.

Reception

Critical response
Long Night's Journey Into Day has an approval rating of 94% on review aggregator website Rotten Tomatoes, based on 16 reviews, and an average rating of 7.48/10. It also has a score of 85 out of 100 on Metacritic, based on 4 critics, indicating "universal acclaim".

References

External links

Long Night's Journey into Day at Seventh Art Releasing

Documentary films about apartheid
2000 films
2000 documentary films
Afrikaans-language films
American documentary films
South African documentary films
Documentary films about reconciliation
2000s English-language films
2000s American films